The Portfolio, Programme and Project Management Maturity Model (P3M3) is a management maturity model looking across an organization at how it delivers its projects, programmes and portfolio(s). P3M3 looks at the whole system and not just one processes.  The hierarchical approach enables organisations to assess their capability and then plot a roadmap for improvement prioritised by those key process areas (KPAs) which will make the biggest impact on performance.

Context 
P3M3 is owned by Axelos, a joint venture between the UK Government and Capita which took ownership of the materials in January 2014. Prior to this, P3M3 was owned by the Office of Government Commerce (OGC), a department within the UK Government with a remit to help public sector organisations improve their efficiency, gain better value for money from procurements and deliver improved success from programmes and projects.

The P3M3 aims to provide an assessment and measurement score for the portfolio, programme and project-related activities within process areas that contribute to achieving a successful project outcome. The levels described within the P3M3 indicate how key process areas can be structured hierarchically to define a progression of capability which an organisation can use to set goals and plan their improvement journey.

There have been three versions of P3M3. Version 1 was issued in 2005 - this model worked on the basis that organisational maturity started with project management, then moved to programme management with portfolio management maturity coming at the highest level of maturity. Version 2 was released in 2008 - this version included the 7 Perspectives and created a model which recognised that project, programme and portfolio maturity were not incremental and enabled the assessment of each model independently. Version 3 was released in 2015 - this version provided for deeper analysis and diagnostics by the inclusion of Threads, which run through each of the Perspectives. 

The levels facilitate organisational transitions from an immature state to become a mature and capable organisation with an objective basis for judging quality and solving programme and project issues.

P3M3 is made up of three models, which can be assessed individually or as a group:
 Project Management
 Programme Management
 Portfolio Management 

For each of the models, P3M3 reviews the maturity and performance against seven perspectives:

 Organisational Governance
 Benefits and/or Requirements Management 
 Financial Controls
 Risk Management 
 Stakeholder Management
 Resource Management 
 Management Controls 

In 2015 the concept of Threads was added to enable better diagnostics, these apply to all perspectives:
 Assurance
 Asset Management (optional)
 Behaviours
 Commercial sell (optional)
 Commercial buy (optional)
 Information and knowledge management 
 Infrastructure and tools
 Planning
 Organisation
 Techniques
 Process 
 Model integration

Assessments 

Companies and organisations can utilise the P3M3 model via materials available on the Axelos web-site on a self-assessment basis.  The assessment itself provides a measure which indicates maturity.  Being assessed provides useful business information, but does not provide an award or accreditation to the business being assessed. See accreditation.

There is some advantage in having a third party carry out such assessments to ensure objectivity and impartiality.  Some hire an individual specialist to undertake the self-assessment on their behalf, or engage an accredited consultancy company to perform this as a service.

P3M3 accredited consulting companies are usually able to offer a suite of assessments:
PRINCE2 Maturity Model(P2MM)
Project Management Maturity Model(PJM3)
Programme  Management Maturity Model(PGM3)
Portfolio Management Maturity Model(PFM3)

Lead author history
2008 Version 2 - Rod Sowden
2015 Version 3 - joint lead authors - Rod Sowden & Andy Murray

Accreditation 
The accreditation scheme offered by Axelos is aimed at consulting companies, for such to become accredited in the provision of P3M3 assessments.

Unlike other related methodologies such as PRINCE2 and Managing Successful Programmes (MSP), etc., there is not a similar accreditation for individual practitioners. Instead, there is the Registered Consultant (RC) scheme, aimed an individuals working within accredited consulting companies (ACOs).

See also 
PRINCE2
Capability Maturity Model
Project Management Body of Knowledge

References 

OGC P3M3 Introduction and Guide (PDF 17 pages, 984k)
P3M3 White-paper
 P3M3 summary introduction paper
Lessons learned from P3M3 assessments of high performing organisations
P3M3 interactive quick reference guide
 Video providing overview of P3M3 and insight into how the latest version functions

External links 
AXELOS Website

Project management